Demikhovo Machinebuilding Plant or Demikhovsky Engineering Plant (abbreviated DMZ) is a Russian open joint-stock company that makes trains. It has been awarded the Order of the Red Banner of Labour.

The company became  part of Transmashholding in accordance with the Decree of the Governor of Moscow Region Boris Gromov of 20 July 2001, submitted to the departmental submission to the Committee on Transport, Moscow region.

History 

Since its inception in May 1935, the profile of Demikhov changed several times. There were activities in chemical engineering and the peat industry. But since 1992, the main products manufactured are electric multiple unit trains on 3000 V DC and 25 kV VAC at 50 Hz.

During its life, Demikhov has produced seventeen different types of trains and produced over 3,000 examples, operated in Russia, Ukraine, Belarus and Kazakhstan.

In 2006 Demikhovsky produced and sold 571 trains of types ED4M, ED9M, and ED4MK). Various spare parts sold for nearly $40 million. In 2006 the company presented its new development, the ED4MKM.

In 2007 Demikhovsky produced and sold 630 electric trains of types ED4M, ED9M, and ED9MK.

In 2008 the electric intermodal passenger transport train ED4MKM-AERO was certified.

Product line 
ED2T Electric (Electric Demikhovsky, version 2):  a series of Russian electric direct current, commercially available from 1993 to 1999 
ED9 (Electric Demikhovsky, 9th class): a series of alternating electric trainsets, produced since 1995
ED4 (Electric Demikhovsky, version 4): a series of Russian electric trainsets, produced since 1996 
ED4MKM: the upgraded version of the electric trainsets ED4, produced since 2005
ED9E: an upgrade with energy-efficient electrical equipment, produced since 2012

Gallery

References

External links 
Official website  

Rail vehicle manufacturers of Russia
Manufacturing companies of the Soviet Union
Companies based in Moscow Oblast
Manufacturing companies established in 1935
1935 establishments in the Soviet Union
Transmashholding